Internationalism may refer to:

 Cosmopolitanism, the view that all human ethnic groups belong to a single community based on a shared morality as opposed to communitarianism, patriotism and nationalism
 International Style, a major architectural movement that was developed in the 1920s and 1930s
 Internationalism (linguistics), loanwords that occur translingually with the same or at least similar meaning and etymology
 Internationalism (politics), a political movement that advocates a greater economic and political cooperation among nations
 Internationalism (Venezuela), a Venezuelan political party
 Internationalist–defencist schism, a current within the socialist movement opposed to World War I
 Multilateralism (international relations), multiple countries working in concert on a given issue
 Proletarian internationalism, the Marxist view of internationalism

See also

 International (disambiguation)
 Internationalist (disambiguation)
 Internationality
 Nationalism